Mirjam Elisabeth Novak (born 16 January in Nuremberg) is an actress and screenwriter of Croatian-German descent who has appeared in various films and television shows in the US, England, Canada and Germany.

She moved to Los Angeles to attend the Lee Strasberg Theatre and Film Institute there in 2001 and completed her training in 2005. After that, Mirjam returned to her native Germany and enrolled at the Humboldt University in Berlin, earning a Bachelor of Arts degree in History and English in 2009.

In May 2009 she was one of 16 finalists out of over 34,000 applicants for Tourism Queensland's "The Best Job In The World" competition. She subsequently spent almost 3 months travelling in Australia and blogging about her experience and appeared in a series of commercials for Tourism Queensland. She also was involved with Tourism Queensland as ambassador for the region in Germany.

She has appeared in the short film Bauhaus Broken Wings (as Ellen Schuster) that went to several festivals; and in films such as The Spy Who Dumped Me (as Verne) and series such as Strike Back (as Marie Parker) as well as on German television with the series 112 – Sie retten dein Leben (as Tara Zenner).

Selected filmography

References

External links 
 Official website
 

1981 births
German film actresses
German television actresses
German people of Croatian descent
Living people
Humboldt University of Berlin alumni
Lee Strasberg Theatre and Film Institute alumni
Actors from Nuremberg
German screenwriters
German women screenwriters
21st-century German actresses
Film people from Nuremberg